The Embassy of Ukraine in Nicosia is the diplomatic mission of Ukraine in Nicosia, Cyprus.

History of the diplomatic relations
The Republic of Cyprus recognized the independence of Ukraine on December 27, 1991. Diplomatic relations between Ukraine and the Republic of Cyprus were established on February 19, 1992, by signing of the relevant Protocol between two countries in New York. The General Consulate of Ukraine was opened in Nicosia, in August 1999, and in June 2003 the Embassy of Ukraine to the Republic of Cyprus began its functioning.

Heads of diplomatic missions
 Dmytro Markow (1999–2002)
 Borys Humenjuk  (2003–2007)
 Oleksandr Demjanjuk (2007–2012)
 Borys Humenjuk (2012–2019)
 Natalija Sirenko (2019–2020)
 Ruslan Nimtschynskyj  (2020–)

See also
 Cyprus–Ukraine relations
 List of diplomatic missions in Cyprus
 Foreign relations of Cyprus
 Foreign relations of Ukraine

References

External Links
 

Nicosia
Ukraine
Cyprus–Ukraine relations
Buildings and structures in Nicosia